The 2020 Venezuelan protests were mass demonstrations against food shortages, medicine and fuel shortages and the Crisis in Venezuela. Police has used tear gas, rubber bullets and Live ammunition to quell the mass uprising and strike movement, killing 6 altogether.

Protests
Protests erupted in March as a continuation of protests against Nicolas Maduro (resume of the 2019 Venezuelan protests) which left 4 dead. In April, riots occurred in at least 100 cities and towns nationwide against food shortages, calling for better conditions and an end to the escalating political crisis. Protesters marched in the largest protest movement on 24 April.

Protesters rallied in late-May for 2 days, striking against the government's handling of the COVID-19 pandemic and calling on an end to shortages of food, fuel and medicine. Rioting broke out in the next few hours. Police fired tear gas to quell the first wave of demonstrations, but police presence was scarce during the second wave of popular protests prompted by even further tensions, violence, killings, crisis and shortages.

4 days of daily protests gained momentum and widespread unrest continued throughout 105+ areas in the country. Thousands participated in protests against late service deliveries and called on a solution to end the electricity, fuel and gas shortages. The wave of demonstrations and protests is the biggest since March. 2 have been killed during the second wave of demonstrations.

See also
 2017 Venezuelan protests
 2019 Venezuelan protests
 2018 Venezuelan protest movement

References

2020 protests
Protests in Venezuela
Riots and civil disorder in Venezuela